Ticio Escobar (born February 9, 1947) is a Paraguayan lawyer, academic, author, museum director, and former Minister of Culture of Paraguay. He has championed the rights of Indigenous peoples of Paraguay, writing about and curating shows on the topic.

Early life and education 
Escobar was born on February 9, 1947, in Asunción. His father was jurist Jorge H. Escobar, and his mother is María Rosalba Argaña Ferraro. He graduated in law at the Universidad Católica Nuestra Señora de la Asunción in 1970. Five years later, in 1974, he obtained his Master's degree (licencia) here in Philosophy. During his study, he was a member of the Comisión de Defensa de los Derechos Humanos en el Paraguay, a human rights group.

Academic career
Between 1971 and 1989, Escobar was a university professor in the fields of philosophy of law, mathematical logic, philosophical anthropology, history of art and art criticism.

Until 1980, he was an art reviewer for the Museo Paraguayo de Arte Contemporáneo. In 1979 he founded the Museo del Barro (museum of pottery) in Asunción, with the objective to preserve Paraguayan culture. The same year he also founded the Museo de Arte Indígena, Centro de Artes Visuales (museum for indigenous art, center of visual art). To this museum, of which he was also the director until 2008, he donated his own art collection.

Arts and activism
Between 1978 and 1988, Escobar was the curator for Paraguay at the Biennale of São Paulo. Furthermore, he was curator for several versions of the Venice Biennale and the biennales of Cuenca, Trujillo, San Juan, Buenos Aires, Lima and Porto Alegre, and for a number of expositions in Latin America and Europe. At the beginning of the 1990s, he joined two movements for Indigenous peoples' rights: the Asociación Indigenista del Paraguay and the Asociación Apoyo a las Comunidades Indígenas del Paraguay (ACIP).

From 1991 to 1996 he was Director of Culture of the city of Asunción. In 1996 he won a national contest to edit a bill on culture, which was later adopted by parliament as Ley Escobar 3051/06. From 2008 to 2013 he was the Minister of Culture of the government of Fernando Lugo.

He was a chairman of the Paraguayan section of the International Association of Art Critics, and has written more than ten books.

Recognitions 
Escobar received several international awards, including:
1984: Latin American Art Critic of the Year, from the Argentinean department of the International Association of Art Critics
1991: Premio Sudamérica of the Centro de Estudios Históricos, Antropológicos y Sociales of Buenos Aires
1997: Commander in the Order of Rio Branco
1998: Scholarship of the Guggenheim Foundation
1998: Key to the city of Havana
1998: Prince Claus Award, Netherlands
2000: Basilio Uribe Prize of the Argentinean Association of Art Critics
2003: Honorary Professor of the Instituto Universitario Nacional de Arte (IUNA), Buenos Aires
2004: Bartolomé de las Casas Prize of the Casa de América, Madrid
2005: Order of May, Argentina
2009: Knight in the Ordre des Arts et des Lettres, France
2011: Prize for Distinguished Contribution to Art Criticism, International Association of Art Critics (AICA)
 2013: Beloved Son of Asuncion Distinction, Asuncion, Paraguay
 2015: Master of Art, Asuncion, Paraguay

Notes 

20th-century philosophers
21st-century philosophers
1947 births
Art critics
Paraguayan critics
Art historians
Paraguayan curators
Living people
Mathematical logicians
Museum directors
Paraguayan academics
Paraguayan politicians
Paraguayan male writers
People from Asunción
Philosophers of law
Philosophical anthropology
Paraguayan philosophers
Universidad Católica Nuestra Señora de la Asunción alumni